A gireogi appa (Korean: 기러기 아빠,  literally "goose dad") is a South Korean term that refers to a man who works in Korea while his wife and children stay in an English-speaking country such as the United States, Canada, the United Kingdom, Australia or New Zealand for the sake of the children's education.

Many Korean people desire to speak English well. This desire is sometimes referred to as "English Fever". English proficiency is very important not only for students but also for office workers because they believe that English skills determine their social position and promotion in the company. However, it is not easy for Koreans to learn and speak English fluently due to the difference in sentence structure between Korean and English. To overcome this difficulty, some parents choose to raise their young children in one of the English-speaking countries, and in the process, mothers and children live together in a foreign country, and fathers remain in Korea and live alone.

The term is inspired by the fact that geese are a species that migrate, just as the gireogi appa father must travel a great distance to see his family. Estimates of the number of gireogi appa in South Korea range as high as 200,000 men. The word 'gireogi appa' was included in the report '2002 New Word'  by the National Academy of Korean Language.

Social problem
To provide a better educational environment for children, mothers usually decide to live in a foreign country with their children, and fathers are left alone in South Korea. It is difficult for these goose dads to communicate regularly with their families who live far away. Although the Internet and phones enable them to interact with their families indirectly, it is not easy to have good family communication. In addition, due to a sudden change in the form of the family, fathers who live alone suffer from extremely intense loneliness and desolation. This feeling of loneliness causes some fathers to have a sexual relationship with someone other than their wife, commit suicide, or put them at risk of dying alone.

Related terms
If the gireogi appa has the finances to pay for frequent visits to see his family, he is called an "eagle dad" (독수리 아빠) but if finances constrict his ability to travel abroad, he is known as a "penguin dad" (펭귄 아빠) because he cannot fly and may go without seeing his family for years at a time.
If the man cannot afford to send his children abroad, he rents a small studio for his wife and children in Gangnam, an area dense with hagwon. That father is called a "sparrow dad"(참새 아빠). And if the man sends his children to elementary school in Daechi, he hires lodgings and is called a "Daejeondong dad"(대전동아빠).

More than 40,000 South Korean schoolchildren are believed to be living in the United States, Canada, England, Australia, New Zealand, Philippines, Singapore and Malaysia  expressly to increase English-speaking ability. As of 2009, over 100,000 Korean students were studying abroad. In at least some of the cases, a South Korean mother will choose to live abroad with her children with the additional reason of avoiding her mother-in-law, with whom a historically stressful relationship may exist due to Korean Confucianism.

See also
Astronaut family
Contemporary culture of South Korea
Education in South Korea
Flying geese paradigm
Globalization
Hagwon
Kikokushijo
Haigui

References

External links
Korea Times Phenomenon of Wild Goose Fathers in South Korea  02-22-2009 by Agnes Goh-Grapes
 펭귄 아빠, 독수리 아빠? Chosun Ilbo 2007.05.30

Academic pressure in East Asian culture
Education in South Korea
Student exchange
South Korean culture
Society of South Korea
2002 neologisms
Metaphors referring to birds